This is a list of the Austrian Singles Chart number-one hits of 1994.

See also
1994 in music

References

1994 in Austria
1994 record charts
Lists of number-one songs in Austria